Adavosertib (development codes AZD1775, MK-1775) is an experimental anti-cancer drug candidate. It is a small molecule inhibitor of the tyrosine kinase WEE1 with potential antineoplastic sensitizing activity. It is being developed by AstraZeneca. It is being investigated as a treatment for pancreatic cancer with phase 1 trial. University of Michigan researchers are as of 2019 planning a phase 2 study.

References 

Experimental cancer drugs
Piperazines
Pyridines
AstraZeneca brands
Tertiary alcohols
Tyrosine kinase inhibitors